The Cross Road is a 2008 film written and directed by Alexandra Thompson. Starring Shenae Grimes as Bridget and Garen Boyajian as Salaam, it is the story of love and intolerance.

Synopsis
The Cross Road is a modern Romeo and Juliet type of story. The Syrian Ahmed family has recently immigrated to the States and chooses to live in Middle America. The family is confronted by the Monroes, an American family who has a great distrust of foreigners, particularly Arabs. Walker Monroe (Bruce Gooch) wants to drive the Syrian family out of their town. Meanwhile, Salaam (Garen Boyajian), the young son of the immigrants has fallen in love with the American family's daughter Bridget (Shenae Grimes). Walker recruits a fatherless teen next door to help him drive the Ahmeds out of his town but in doing so he jeopardizes Salaam's life and his own daughter's happiness.

Cast
Garen Boyajian as Salaam
Shenae Grimes as Bridget
Bruce Gooch as Walker
Tommy Lioutas as Chris
Allan Aarons as Costa
Terry C. Barna as Police Officer #1
Richard Blackburn as Principal
Callahan Connor as Steve
Susan Greenfield as Jane
Cecilia Jalaidan as Laila
Sabrina Jalees	as Muslim Gi
Keira Loughran	as Art Teacher
Sean O'Neil as Paul
Farzad Sadrian as Ali

Awards / Nominations
Wins
Actor Garen Boyajian, winner of "Best Male Actor" at the Monaco International Film Festival for his role in the film as Salaam
Actors Garen Boyajian, Shenae Grimes, Tommy Lioutas, Bruce Gooch and Sean O'Neill, co-winners of "Best Ensemble Cast" at the same festival
Director Alexandra Thompson won the AFA Award at the 2008 Angel Film Awards
Nominations
The film was also nominated for the "Golden Aphrodite Award" at the Cyprus International Film Festival.

References

External links
Official website

2008 films
Films based on Romeo and Juliet
2000s English-language films